The Yamaha WR450F is an off-road motorcycle made by Yamaha Motor Company. It currently has a  liquid-cooled single-cylinder engine. First offered in 1998 at 400cc, it shared many components and design concepts with the YZ400F motocross model. It is basically the racing YZ450F detuned slightly for more controllable power, with a headlight and lighting coil, softer suspension, a kickstand, lower noise specifications, larger radiators and lower emissions. The WR in the name indicates a wide-ratio gear box common to most enduro or trail bikes and stands in contrast to the close-ratio gearbox essential to a motocross racer. Over the years the WR has benefited from the advances made in the YZ motocross version gaining displacement and advancements such as an aluminum frame and improved suspension.  Over much of its life the weight of the WR450F has remained fairly constant ranging from 244 to 249 pounds dry weight.

First generation: WR400F - 1998-2000

Yamaha introduced the WR 400F in 1998. The 400F is a  four-stroke off-road motorcycle produced for three years, beginning in 1998 and ending in 2000 (only the YZ was upgraded to 426 cc in 2000). The WR400F is related to the YZ400F, a motocross model. Like the YZ400, it was considered to be a groundbreaking model in motorcycle history, ushering in the four-stroke era which ended the dominance of two-stroke engines in motocross and offroad racing. While many modern performance four-stroke dirt bikes have been criticized for excessive rebuild costs and short motor lifespans, the Yamaha WR400F has an impressive record of reliability, often attributed to its steel valves and generous oil capacity.

Second generation: WR426F - 2001-2002
A beefier YZ style clutch basket and plates than those on the WR400 improved clutch performance. Frame geometry was identical to the 2002 YZ250 and YZ426F with a 58.7 inch wheelbase and 14.7 inches of ground clearance. This was the last WR to make use of a manual compression release for starting.

Third generation: Yamaha WR450F - 2003-2006

The 2005 WR weighed in at 244 pounds dry, the seat height was reduced to 38 inches and the fuel tank was decreased to 2.1 gallons. The 2006 WR weighed in at 249 pounds dry and produced 42 horsepower.

A limited production version of the WR450F was the WR450F 2-Trac, which featured 2-wheel drive. The gearbox output sprocket drove a short, fully enclosed chain to a pump, which in turn pushed the oil to the front hub via the pipe and back via the parallel pipe. A maximum of 15% of the power was transmitted to the front wheel at any time. Yamaha planned on building 250 2-Tracs in 2004, but only a few were built, which were used for enduro racing. 2006 was the last year of the steel frames.

The 2003 and 2004 models were red sticker bikes in California.

Fourth generation: Yamaha WR450F - 2007-2011

For 2007, the WR gained an aluminum frame dropping the weight from 249 to 246 pounds.
In addition to the aluminum frame, the 2007 WR450F saw a revised dry-sump engine, with a new balancer, cylinder head, and camshafts with less lift and duration than previous generations and restyled plastics.  2009 saw new graphics, and 2010 was not sold in the US.

Fifth generation: Yamaha WR450F - 2012-2015

After 3 years of design, the all-new 2012 WR450F was released and featured a 2012 YZ250F frame, KYB SSS forks, fuel injection, and an altered motor position.  Per Yamaha's designers, the only modifications required to the YZ250F chassis were updated motor mounts.  The engine was rotated back to move the center of gravity and improve handling

Sixth generation: Yamaha WR450F - 2016-2018

For 2016,  the WR was given the reverse slant, 4-valve, fuel injected motor previously available in the YZ450F since 2010. Yamaha also introduced a new model, the YZ450FX, a more Enduro competition oriented version of the off-road 450 utilizing more design elements of the motocross model such as stiffer suspension while maintaining electric start and the 18" rear wheel.

For 2017, the WR450F largely remained the same, except for modifications to the air box cover as well as a change from silver to black rims.

For 2018, the WR450F remained similar to the 2016-2017 models, with a large distinction being that the bike was no longer available to register as green sticker in the state of California.  2018 also saw the removal of the kick starter.

https://www.yamahamotorsports.com/off-road/models/2016/wr450f

Seventh generation: Yamaha WR450F - 2019-2020

The 2019 WR450F saw a more powerful motor & updated frame.  This generation no longer supports a kick starter.  Other changes include a revised, more compact frame, new speed sensor, bigger fuel tank and one fastener airbox access.

Seventh generation: Yamaha WR450F - 2021-Present
The 2021 WR450F saw new cylinder head, camshafts, piston and connecting rods. The 2021 also saw a revised chassis as well.

See also 
 Yamaha WR250F
 Yamaha YZ450F
 Yamaha YZ450FX

References 

WR450F
Off-road motorcycles
Motorcycles introduced in 1998